"Michael Jackson x Mark Ronson: Diamonds Are Invincible", often shortened to just "Diamonds Are Invincible", is a song by Michael Jackson and Mark Ronson. The mashup was released digitally on August 29, 2018 on what would have been Jackson's 60th birthday.

Background and release
On August 29, 2018, for the celebration of Jackson's 60th birthday, "Diamonds Are Invincible" premiered worldwide. The song is a mash-up composed of eight of Jackson's songs—"Don't Stop 'Til You Get Enough", "Wanna Be Startin' Somethin'", "Billie Jean", "Smooth Criminal", "Remember the Time", "Human Nature", "You Rock My World" and "The Way You Make Me Feel".

Track listing

References

2018 singles
Mark Ronson songs
Mashup songs
Michael Jackson songs
Songs written by Michael Jackson
Songs written by Teddy Riley
Songs written by Bernard Belle
Songs written by Steve Porcaro
Songs with lyrics by John Bettis
Songs written by Rodney Jerkins
Songs written by Fred Jerkins III
Songs written by LaShawn Daniels
Song recordings produced by Mark Ronson
Songs released posthumously
2018 songs
Remix singles